Eichkögl is a municipality in the district of Südoststeiermark in Styria, Austria.

Population

References

Cities and towns in Südoststeiermark District